Chattambikkalyaani is a 1975 Indian Malayalam film,  directed by J. Sasikumar and produced by Sreekumaran Thampi. The film stars Prem Nazir, Lakshmi, K. P. Ummer and M. G. Soman in the lead roles. The film has musical score by M. K. Arjunan.

Cast

Prem Nazir as Gopi/CID Narendranath 
Lakshmi as Kalyani
K. P. Ummer as Vaasu
M. G. Soman as Kochu Thamburan
Veeran as Chembakasseri Thirumanassu
Thikkurussi Sukumaran Nair as Daivam Mathai
T. R. Omana as Sethutty
Jagathy Sreekumar as Pappu
KPAC Lalitha as Gracy
Sreelatha Namboothiri as Lilly
T. S. Muthaiah as Pareed
Alummoodan as Marmam Mammad
Adoor Bhasi as Shareeram Kuttappan
Philomina as Pathumma Beegam
Kuthiravattam Pappu as Kochappan
Baby Sumathi as Young Kalyani
Master Raghu as Young Vaasu
Nilamboor Balan as James
J. A. R. Anand as Khader
Jayakumari as Devi
Khadeeja as Paaru
Kunchan as Chotta Sulthan
Surasu as Settu

Soundtrack

References

External links
 

1975 films
1970s Malayalam-language films
Films directed by J. Sasikumar